Antiplanes isaotakii is a species of sea snail, a marine gastropod mollusk in the family Pseudomelatomidae.

Description

Distribution 
This marine species occurs off Japan.

References 

 Habe, T. (1958b) Description of three new species of the genus Rectiplanes from Japan. Venus, 20, 181–186

External links 
 

isaotakii
Gastropods described in 1958